Sergei Sergeyevich Shapovalov (born 14 February 1995) is a former Russian professional football player.

Club career
He made his Russian Football National League debut for FC Luch-Energiya Vladivostok on 27 May 2012 in a game against FC Fakel Voronezh.

External links
 
 
 
 Career summary at sportbox.ru

1995 births
People from Primorsky Krai
Living people
Russian footballers
FC Luch Vladivostok players
Association football midfielders
FC Arsenal Tula players
FC Sibir Novosibirsk players
FC Smena Komsomolsk-na-Amure players
FC Dynamo Kirov players
Sportspeople from Primorsky Krai